The Americas Zone was one of the three zones of regional Davis Cup competition in 2006.

In the Americas Zone there are three different groups in which teams compete against each other to advance to the next group.

Participating nations

Seeds:

Remaining Nations

Draw

 relegated to Group II in 2007.
 and  advance to World Group Play-off.

First round

Peru vs. Brazil

Venezuela vs. Mexico

Second round

Ecuador vs. Brazil

Mexico vs. Canada

First round playoffs

Peru vs. Ecuador

Canada vs. Venezuela

Second round playoffs

Venezuela vs. Ecuador

References
Draw

Americas Zone Group I
Davis Cup Americas Zone